Aranath was the eighteenth Jain Tirthankar of the present half cycle of time (Avasarpini). He was also the eighth Chakravartin and thirteenth Kamadeva. According to Jain beliefs, he was born around 16,585,000 BCE. He became a siddha i.e. a liberated soul which has destroyed all of its karmas. Aranath was born to King Sudarshana and Queen Devi (Mitra) at Hastinapur in the Ikshvaku dynasty. His birth date was the tenth day of the Migsar Krishna month of the Indian calendar. 

There were 50,000 monks with arnath.

Life
Like all other Chakravartin, he also conquered all the lands and went to write his name on the foothills of mountains. Seeing the names of other Chakravartin already there, he saw his ambitions dwarfed. He then renounced his throne and became an ascetic for penance. At an age over 84,000 years he and attained Moksha (liberation) on Mount Shikharji.

Worship 
Svayambhūstotra by Acarya Samantabhadra is the adoration of twenty-four tirthankaras. Twenty slokas (aphorisms) of Svayambhūstotra are dedicated to Tirthankar Aranath. One such sloka is:

As a historical figure

At Mathura, there is an old stupa with the inscription of 157 CE. This inscription records that an image of the tīrthankara Aranath was set up at the stupa built by the gods. However, Somadeva Suri stated in Yashstilaka and Jinaprabha Suri in Vividha Tirtha Kalpa that the stupa was erected for Suparśvanātha.

Temples 
 Navagarh Tirth
 Chaturmukha Basadi is a famous Jain temple located at Karkala in the Indian state of Karnataka. The temple is dedicated to Tirthankara Aranatha, Mallinath and Munisuvratnath.
 Prachin Bada Mandir, Hastinapur, Uttar Pradesh

See also

God in Jainism
Arihant (Jainism)
Jainism and non-creationism

References

Sources
 
 
 
 
 
 

Tirthankaras